HD 85725, also known as HR 3916, is a yellow hued star located in the southern constellation Antlia. It has an apparent magnitude of 6.29, placing it near the limit for naked eye visibility.

HD 85725 has a stellar classification of G1 V, which indicates that it is an ordinary G-type main-sequence star that is fusing hydrogen at its core. However, a low surface gravity of  suggests that the object is instead an evolved subgiant. 

At present it has 143% the mass of the Sun but is 2.59 times larger, which is not characteristic of a yellow dwarf. It shines at 7.6 times the luminosity of the Sun from its photosphere at a surface temperature of 5,940 K, which gives it a yellow glow.

It appears to have a common proper motion with the star, suggesting physical relation.

References

Antlia
085725
G-type main-sequence stars
3916
High-proper-motion stars
048468
Durchmusterung objects